Korean dragons are legendary creatures in Korean mythology and folklore. The appearance of the dragon reflects its relation to its East Asian counterparts, including the Chinese dragons.

Korean dragons

Whereas most dragons in European mythology are linked to the elements of fire and destruction, dragons in Korean mythology are primarily benevolent beings related to water and agriculture, often considered bringers of rain and clouds. Hence, many Korean dragons are said to have resided in rivers, lakes, oceans, or even deep mountain ponds.

The symbol of the dragon has been used extensively in Korean culture, both in Korean mythology and ancient Korean art.

Ancient texts sometimes mention sentient speaking dragons, capable of understanding complex emotions such as devotion, kindness, and gratitude. One particular Korean legend speaks of the great King Munmu, who on his deathbed wished to become a "Dragon of the East Sea in order to protect Korea".

The Korean dragon is in many ways very similar in appearance to other East Asian dragons such as the Chinese and Japanese dragons. It differs from the Chinese dragon in that it developed a longer beard. Very occasionally a dragon may be depicted as carrying a giant orb known as the yeouiju (여의주), the Korean name for the mythical Cintamani, in its claws or its mouth. It was said that whoever could wield the yeouiju was blessed with the abilities of omnipotence and creation at will and that only four-toed dragons (who had thumbs with which to hold the orbs) were both wise and powerful enough to wield these orbs, as opposed to the lesser, three-toed dragons.

As with China, the number nine is significant and auspicious in Korea, and dragons were said to have 81 (9×9) scales on their backs, representing yang essence.

Imugi
Korean folk mythology states that most dragons were originally imugis, or lesser dragons, which were said to resemble gigantic serpents. There are a few different versions of Korean folklore that describe both what imugis are and how they aspire to become full-fledged dragons. Koreans thought that an imugi could become a true dragon, or yong or mireu, if it caught a Yeouiju which had fallen from heaven. Another explanation states they are hornless creatures resembling dragons who have been cursed and thus were unable to become dragons. By other accounts, an imugi is a proto-dragon that must survive one thousand years in order to become a fully-fledged dragon. In either case, they are said to be large, benevolent, python-like creatures that live in water or caves, and their sighting is associated with good luck.

The imugi is also called an ishimi, a miri, a young-no (youngno, yeongno, yeong-no), a gangcheori (kangcheori) or kkwangcheori or Kkangcheori, a Bari, a Hweryong or an iryong.

In popular culture 

 In the 2007 South Korean film D-War, two imugi, one benevolent and the other evil, are seen competing for possession of a source of power called the Yeouiju (여의주), by which one of them could become a dragon. Ultimately, the evil imugi is destroyed by his rival moments after the latter had captured the source. Here, the two are shown to be physically different, in that the evil imugi is darker-colored, more slender and distinguished by an inflexible hood similar to that of a cobra, whereas the good imugi is paler, stockier, hoodless, and more closely resembles a python. Narration in the film implies that many imugi exist at a time, whereof few are designated to become a dragon.
 An imugi is the main antagonist in the 2020 South Korean drama Tale of the Nine-tailed. In the series, the imugi is portrayed as a serpent in human form with the ability to possess humans, infect people with deadly, contagious diseases, and read people's minds. In the past, he unsuccessfully sought to become a dragon spirit. After his failure, he attempted to take over a kingdom but was killed by the mountain spirit Lee Yeon with aid from the kingdom's princess, Ah-eum. Resurrecting in the present day, he seeks revenge on both the spirit and the reincarnation of Ah-eum, Nam Ji-ha.

Gangcheori
Gangcheori (Hangul: 강철이) is a dragon-shaped monster in Korean mythology that was introduced in the 17th century. It is a monster that has traditionally been popular throughout the country. It also has been called Gangcheol (Hangul: 강철), Kkangcheol (Hangul: 깡철), and Ggoangcheol (Hangul: 꽝철).

One of the earliest records of Gangcheori being mentioned is the Jibong Yuseol (1614). In those days, there was an old saying, "Where Gangcheori goes is like spring even it is fall." When author Lee Soo-kwang asked an old man in the countryside about the origin of the word, the old man told him about a monster called Gangcheori that burns down everything in a few miles.

Korean cockatrice
The Korean cockatrice is known as a gye-lyong, which literally means chicken-dragon; they do not appear as often as dragons. They are sometimes seen as chariot-pulling beasts for important legendary figures or for the parents of legendary heroes. One such legend involves the founding of the Kingdom of Silla, whose Lady Aryeong was said to have been born from a cockatrice egg. It is also the origin of the name for the city of Gyeryong in South Chungcheong province.

Gallery

Dragons related to the Korean dragon
 Chinese dragon 
 Druk, the Thunder Dragon of Bhutanese mythology 
 Japanese dragon 
 Nāga, a Hindu and Buddhist creature in South Asian and Southeast Asian mythology. 
 Bakunawa, a moon-eating sea dragon depicted in Philippine mythology 
 Vietnamese dragon

See also

References

Further reading
Bates, Roy, Chinese Dragons, Oxford University Press, 2002.
Bates, Roy, All About Chinese Dragons, China History Press, 2007.
'Korean Water and Mountain Spirits', in: Ingersoll, Ernest, et al., (2013). The Illustrated Book of Dragons and Dragon Lore. Chiang Mai: Cognoscenti Books. ASIN B00D959PJ0

External links
Podcast: The Meaning of Dragons in Korean Folklore from The Korea Society

 
 

Dragons
Korean legendary creatures